Basic Education High School Tagondaing is a public high school located in the Kale, Tagundaing, Kayin State, Myanmar. It offers classes from fifth standard to tenth standard (or Grade 6 through Grade 11 in the new nomenclature) to about 887 students.

Uniform 

Like all public schools in Myanmar, Kale, Tagondaing students wear school uniform. All uniforms are of the same colour - a white shirt or blouse, with a green garment for the bottom.
School-boys wear a white shirt (with or without the collar), and a green longyi/Paso.
School-girls must wear either a front opening (yin-zee) or side opening (yin-phone) traditional Burmese blouse, with the green longyi/Htamein as the lower garment.

Buildings

BEHS Tagondaing consists of 6 buildings.

 Two-storey building (Main Building)
 Winyaw Building
 Sabal Building
 Thanlwin Building
 Pearl Building
 Myat Shwe Pyi Hall

List of principals

Facilities
Library room
Multimedia classroom
Science lab
Computer classroom

See also
Basic Education High School in Myanmar

References

External links 
 "B.E.H.S (Tagondaing) Map — Satellite Images of B.E.H.S (Tagondaing)" Maplandia World Gazetteer
B.E.H.S - Tagondaing

Secondary schools in Myanmar